Ashton House is a large country house in Beetham in Cumbria. It is a Grade II* listed building.

History
The house was built in 1678 probably for John and Sarah Yeats: their daughter, Mary Yeats, died there at the age of 25 in the mid 18th century. It was inherited by John Yeats Thexton in the first part of the 19th century and by Edward Yeats Thexton in the latter part of the 19th century and then passed to Charles Frith-Hudson, who had married into the Thexton family, at the start of the 20th century. It became a wedding venue in the 21st century.

See also
Listed buildings in Beetham

References

Country houses in Cumbria
Grade II* listed houses in Cumbria
Houses completed in 1678
Beetham